Warrior Baek Dong-soo is a 2011 South Korean fusion historical/action television series starring Ji Chang-wook in the title role, with Yoo Seung-ho, Yoon So-yi,  Shin Hyun-bin, Choi Min-soo and Jun Kwang-ryul. It aired on SBS from July 4 to October 10, 2011, on Mondays and Tuesdays at 21:55 for 29 episodes.

Based on the 2010 comic Honorable Baek Dong-soo by Lee Jae-heon, the series is about how Joseon historical figure Baek Dong-soo grew to become a swordsman and folk hero. Baek was one of the three authors of Muyedobotongji, a pivotal martial arts work commissioned by King Jeongjo.

Synopsis
Set against the backdrop of political maneuverings in Joseon between different factions, namely those led by King Jeongjo, by the Qing ambassador, by the Japanese swordsman Kenzo, and the assassin's guild Heuksa Chorong, the series is a coming-of-age drama about brotherhood, friendship, loyalty and honor.

Cast

Main
Ji Chang-wook as Baek Dong-soo 
Yeo Jin-goo as young Dong-soo
A carefree swordsman who alters the fate of the nation as a member of the royal guard.
Yoo Seung-ho as Yeo Woon 
Park Gun-tae as young Woon
Son of Yeo Cho-sang. Dong-soo's friend and seeming nemesis. He lives in the shadows as the mole for a mysterious assassin collective aiming to overthrow the dynasty. 
Yoon So-yi as Hwang Jin-joo 
Lee Hye-in as young Jin-joo
Dong-soo's childhood friend. Daughter of Ji/Ga-Ok and Kim Gwang-taek
Shin Hyun-bin as Yoo Ji-sun 
Nam Ji-hyun as young Ji-sun
Consort of Prince Sado, and later love interest of Dong-soo and Woon.
Choi Min-soo as Chun
Leader of assassin's guild Heuksa Chorong, and Yeo Woon's mentor.
Jun Kwang-ryul as Kim Gwang-taek
Joseon's top swordsman, and Dong-soo's mentor.

Supporting
Hong Jong-hyun as King Jeongjo
Park Jun-gyu as Heuk Sa-mo, Baek Dong-soo's guardian
Park Won-sang as Jang Dae-pyo, leader of the training camp
Lee Jin-ah as Jang-mi, Heuk Sa-mo's love interest.
Yoon Ji-min as Ji / Ga-Ok, love interest of Chun and Kim Gwang-taek; mother of Jin-joo. 
Park Chul-min as In / Dae Ung, one of the three leaders of Heuksha Chorong 
Oh Man-seok as Crown Prince Sado
Jeon Guk-hwan as King Yeongjo
Geum Dan-bi as Queen Jeongsun
Lee Won-jong as Hong Dae-ju, Joseon's Minister of State and the series' principal villain
Jung Ho-bin as Im Soo-woong, right-hand man to Prince Sado
Ahn Suk-hwan as Seo Yoo-dae, a Joseon general and loyal ally of Prince Sado
Kim Dong-kyun as Boo Gwan, Hong Dae-ju's incompetent deputy
Choi Jae-hwan as Yang Cho-rip or Hong Guk-yeong, friend of Dong-soo and Woon. 
Shin Dong-woo as young Cho-rip
Um Hyo-sup as Baek Sa-geong
Kim Hee-jung as Lady Park 
Lee Kye-in as Yeo Cho-sang, Yeo Woon's father.
Sung Ji-ru as Hwang Jin-gi, Jin-joo's adoptive father
Kim Da-hyun as Kim Hong-do, painter and ally of Dong-soo. He is romantically interested in Jin-joo.
Kim Eung-soo as Yoo So-kang
Ji Yoo as Jang Mi-so, daughter of Jang Dae-pyo, and later love interest of Cho-rip
Im Kang-sung as Hong Sa-hye, son of Hong Dae-ju
Choi Yoon-so as Goo-hyang, palace lady that helps Yeo Woon when he becomes Sky Lord
Lee Si-eon as Dae-heung
Lee Yong-woo as Kenzo, a Japanese samurai
Choi Yoo-sung
 Jo Woo-jin

Original soundtrack

Part 1

Part 2

Part 3

Part 4

Part 5

Part 6

Part 7

Part 8

Part 9

Viewership
In the table below,  represent the lowest ratings and  represent the highest ratings.

Awards and nominations

References

External links
 Warrior Baek Dong-soo official SBS website 
 
 

Korean-language television shows
Seoul Broadcasting System television dramas
2011 South Korean television series debuts
2011 South Korean television series endings
Television series set in the Joseon dynasty
Television shows based on manhwa
South Korean historical television series
South Korean action television series